Enteromius machadoi is a species of ray-finned fish in the genus Enteromius from the Democratic Republic of the Congo.

Footnotes 

 

Enteromius
Taxa named by Max Poll
Fish described in 1967